This page is about the bed and breakfast in Gettysburg, Pennsylvania. For other uses, see Farnsworth House (disambiguation).
The Farnsworth House Inn is a bed and breakfast and tourist attraction located in Gettysburg, Pennsylvania. The building is purported to be haunted, which the business uses in its promotional literature. Apart from being an inn, the building has also served as a tourist home and shop.

History

Ownership

The land the inn was built on was previously owned by Reverend Alexander Dobbins, who subdivided a larger estate for the purpose of selling it. John F. McFarlane purchased the land and is stated to be the first recorded owner of the home. Portions of the house are said to be dated to the early 1800s and is claimed to have been built in 1810, but the exact date is unclear. McFarlane owned the home until his death in 1851, at which point it became the property of the Bank of Gettysburg. The house passed through the hands of several owners and one of the owners, the Black family, called it the "Sleepy Hollow Inn" with the hook that there were "135" bullet holes in the side of the home. The house was purchased by Loring and Jean Shultz in 1972 and after claiming to have experienced paranormal activity, the family utilized this in the promotion for the inn and conducts tours of the premise.

Historical aspects
The Farnsworth House Inn was also one of the stops of the Gettysburg Address campaign and was, during the Battle of Gettysburg, utilized as a makeshift hospital and resting place for some members of the Confederate Army.

Paranormal

The Shultz family claims that the inn has been haunted by as many as 16 spirits at one point in time and that each spirit has its own distinct personality and name. The identity of the ghosts range from an 8 year old boy named Jeremy to a former mid-wife nurse and several soldiers. Paranormal elements that have been reported are things such as the sound of heavy breathing, the smell of cheroot, and the sensation of the mid-wife "tucking" people into bed. The inn has several rooms that are supposed to be "hot spots" for specific spiritual activity for particular ghosts such as the "Sara Black Room", which is supposed to be one of the most active rooms and will have spirits that can be photographed from the street.

References

External links
 

Reportedly haunted locations in Pennsylvania
American Civil War sites
Bed and breakfasts in Pennsylvania